Ibrahim Al-Jawabreh (born May 10, 1991) is a Jordanian football player, who currently plays as a forward for Al-Seeb.

International career statistics

References

External links 
 
 jo.gitsport.net

Jordanian footballers
Association football forwards
1991 births
Sahab SC players
Al-Ahli SC (Amman) players
Al-Jazeera (Jordan) players
Al-Yarmouk FC (Jordan) players
Mansheyat Bani Hasan players
That Ras Club players
Al-Wehdat SC players
Al-Seeb Club players
Jordanian Pro League players
Oman Professional League players
Living people
Jordan international footballers
Jordanian expatriate footballers
Jordanian expatriate sportspeople in Oman
Expatriate footballers in Oman
Sportspeople from Amman